The World Chess Hall of Fame (WCHOF) is a nonprofit, collecting institution situated in the Central West End neighborhood of St. Louis, Missouri, United States. It features chess exhibits, engages in educational outreach, and maintains a list of inductees to the U.S. Chess Hall of Fame and World Chess Hall of Fame, the latter category being nominated by FIDE. Founded in 1984, it is run by the United States Chess Trust. Formerly located in New Windsor, New York; Washington, D.C.; and Miami, Florida, it moved to St. Louis on September 9, 2011.

History

Steven Doyle, USCF president from 1984 to 1987, founded the World Chess Hall of Fame in 1986 as the U.S. Chess Hall of Fame.

Opened in 1988 in the basement of the Federation's then-headquarters in New Windsor, New York, the small museum contained a small collection, including a book of chess openings signed by Bobby Fischer; a silver set awarded to Paul Morphy, American chess player and unofficial World Champion; and cardboard plaques honoring past grandmasters.

In 1992, the U.S. Chess Trust purchased the museum and moved its contents to Washington D.C. At its Washington D.C. location from 1992 to 2001, the hall featured America's "big four" chess players: Paul Morphy, Bobby Fischer, Frank Marshall, and Samuel Reshevsky. It displayed the World Chess Championship trophy won by the United States team in 1993 as well as numerous chess boards and chess pieces. The museum gave visitors the opportunity to play against a chess computer. By 2001, the collection had grown to include numerous chess sets and boards and plaques commemorating inductees to the U.S. and World halls of fame.

In the late 1990s, Sidney Samole, former owner of Excalibur Electronics, proposed to move the hall of fame to Miami, where it would be located in a rook-shaped building constructed by Excalibur. Although Samole died in 2000, the U.S. Chess Trust accepted the proposal the following year. Reopened in 2001, it was renamed the World Chess Hall of Fame and Sidney Samole Museum. The museum continued collecting chess sets, books, tournament memorabilia, advertisements, photographs, furniture, medals, trophies, and journals until it closed in 2009. Rex Sinquefield soon afterward agreed to pay for moving the museum to St. Louis and renovating its new building.

The World Chess Hall of Fame is located across the street from the Chess Club and Scholastic Center of Saint Louis in the city's Central West End neighborhood. It displays artifacts from the museum's permanent collection and temporary exhibitions highlighting the great players, historic games, and rich cultural history of chess as well as the U.S. and World Chess Hall of Fame.

The Hall of Fame collaborates with the Chess Club and Scholastic Center to provide programming, instruction, and outreach to an international audience of chess players. Its collection includes pieces such as a 500-year-old piece from an Egyptian game called senet, the earliest known board game; a custom-made set of chess furniture that belonged to Bobby Fischer, and the first commercial chess computer. Rotating exhibitions feature items from the permanent collection. The museum also displays two temporary exhibitions per year. The Hall of Fame also commemorates the careers of its members.

Hall of Fame
There are 67 members in the U.S. Hall of Fame, including Bobby Fischer, John W. Collins, Larry Evans, Benjamin Franklin, George Koltanowski, Sammy Reshevsky, Paul Morphy, Gregory Kaidanov, and Arnold Denker.

There are 40 members in the World Hall of Fame, including José Raúl Capablanca, Anatoly Karpov, Garry Kasparov, and Boris Spassky. The winner of the first Women's World Chess Championship, Vera Menchik, was the first woman to be inducted into the WCHOF in 2011.

The 2011 inductions took place on September 8 as part of the World Chess Hall of Fame Grand Opening celebration.

U.S. Chess Hall of Fame inductees
The U.S. Chess Federation Hall of Fame Committee considers candidates for the U.S. Chess Hall of Fame and sends its nominations to the U.S. Chess Trust annually. The trustees of the U.S. Chess Trust vote on who should be inducted. The induction itself take place either at the U.S. Chess Federation Awards Luncheon during the U.S. Open or at the World Chess Hall of Fame, which is now located in St. Louis, Missouri. The induction is almost always performed by either the Chairman of the U.S. Chess Trust or the Chairman of the Hall of Fame Committee.

Current members of the committee are Harold Winston (Chairman), John Donaldson, John McCrary, Al Lawrence, GM Joel Benjamin, GM Arthur Bisguier, John Hilbert, Jennifer Shahade, and Shane Samole. McCrary and Donaldson are former Chairs of the Hall of Fame Committee. Both Bisguier and Benjamin are members of the Hall of Fame. Samole was in charge of the Hall of Fame when it was located in Miami, Florida from 2001-2009.

World Chess Hall of Fame inductees
The World Chess Hall of Fame inductees are nominated by representatives of the World Chess Federation (FIDE).

Exhibitions
The World Chess Hall of Fame moved to St. Louis in 2011. Its permanent collection includes historical chess artifacts, as well as art and artifacts on loan from various artists and collectors.

OUT OF THE BOX: Artists Play Chess
Out of the Box was a contemporary art exhibition displayed from September 9, 2011 to February 12, 2012, and was curated by Bradley Bailey, assistant professor of modern and contemporary art history at Saint Louis University. It featured artworks that consider chess both at the formal level and at the level of actual play. The artists featured in this exhibition were Tom Friedman, Barbara Kruger, Liliya Lifanova, Yoko Ono, Gavin Turk, Diana Thater, and Guido van der Werve. On the exhibit's opening night, Dutch contemporary artist Guido van der Werve performed on a chess piano that he built. The piano sounded a note as each chess piece was played, while nine string musicians from the Saint Louis Symphony played van der Werve's score. On closing night, the Contemporary Art Museum St. Louis hosted an event featuring Liliya Lifanova's performance art piece Anatomy is Destiny, one of the pieces in the exhibition.

Chess Masterpieces: Highlights from the Dr. George and Vivan Dean Collection
On view from September 9, 2011 to February 12, 2012, this show celebrated the Deans' 50th year of collecting together and featured selected works to trace the development of the game of chess and the design of fine chess sets from the tenth to the early twentieth century. Sets came from Austria, Cambodia, China, England, France, Germany, India, Italy, Japan, Kashmir, Morocco, Persia, Russia, Syria, and Turkey. Among the works displayed were pieces owned or commissioned by Catherine the Great, Napoleon, Czar Nicolas II, and the British royal family.

Marcel Dzama: The End Game
On view from March 9, 2012 to August 12, 2012, Marcel Dzama's artistic works were on display, including films, related drawings, paintings, sculptures, and dioramas. Dzama's work draws from a diverse range of references and artistic influences, including Dada and Marcel Duchamp. His film features characters based on the classic game of chess. Dressed in geometrically designed costumes of papier-mâché, plaster, and fiberglass and wearing elaborate masks (including a quadruple-faced mask for the King), the figures dance across a checkered board to challenge their opponents in fatal interchanges.

BOBBY FISCHER: Icon Among Icons
On view from March 9, 2012 to October 7, 2012, this show featured photographs by Harry Benson, the only person to have private access to Bobby Fischer during the entire 1972 World Chess Championship match in Reykjavík, Iceland. Benson captured intimate images of Fischer and was the first person to deliver the news to Fischer that he had won the match.

Screwed Moves
On view from September 13, 2012 to February 10, 2013, this show featured nine of St. Louis' most recognized artists, known as The Screwed Arts Collective, who worked together over a two-week period to produce a one-of-a-kind, site-specific wall drawing inspired by chess.

Everybody's Game: Chess in Popular Culture
On view from October 18, 2012 to April 14, 2013, this show explored how the ancient sport is represented in our contemporary culture by showcasing the game of chess as it has been featured in such mass media as magazine advertisements, rock music and movie posters, and other popular venues.

Power in Check: Chess and the American Presidency
On view from October 18, 2012 to April 21, 2013, this show explored how chess has influenced the American presidency since the administration of George Washington.

Bill Smith: Beyond the Humanities
On view from March 7, 2013 to August 25, 2013, this show featured the work of Bill Smith, which explores how rules guide the creation of our world's structure and behavior. In order to highlight the intersection of art, chess, and nature, Smith used art to show the underlying similarities of all things. His videos and constructions gave a holistic view of the world by presenting the ubiquitous patterns and interactions common to music, games, technology, animals, molecules, and the galaxy.

Prized and Played: Highlights from the Jon Crumiller Collection
On view from May 3, 2013 to September 15, 2013, this event showcased over eighty beautiful, antique chess sets from across the centuries and around the world, as well as many interesting artifacts related to the history of chess.

A Queen Within: Adorned Archetypes, Fashion and Chess
On view from October 19, 2013 to April 19, 2014, this show explored the archetypes of a queen. Works from experimental designers highlighted the queen archetypes in fashion and identified the relationships with the cultural collective unconscious and traditions of storytelling. Curated by independent curators, Sofia Hedman and Serge Martynov.

Jacqueline Piatigorsky: Patron, Player, Pioneer
On view from October 25, 2013 to July 13, 2014, this show explored Jacqueline Piatigorsky's position as one of the best female chess players of the 1950s and 1960s, as well as her support of the game as a patron. It featured artifacts from her personal archive. Highlights included the Piatigorsky Cup, photos from the 1963 and 1966 Piatigorsky Cup tournaments, and artifacts and photos related to Piatigorsky's impressive career in women's chess.

Cage & Kaino: Pieces and Performances
On view from May 8, 2014 to September 21, 2014, this exhibition is accompanied by live performances of the work of 20th-century composer, John Cage, and contemporary multimedia artist, Glenn Kaino. Curated by independent curator, Larry List.

Strategy by Design: Games by Michael Graves
On view from May 8, 2014 to September 28, 2014, this exhibition focuses on the games designed by the Michael Graves Design Group. Curated by independent curator, Bradley Bailey.

A Memorable Life: A Glimpse into the Complex Mind of Bobby Fischer
On view from July 24, 2014 to June 7, 2015, this exhibition explores the career of Bobby Fischer, considered one of the greatest American chess players of all time.

See also

References

External links
World Chess Hall of Fame official website
 World Chess Hall of Fame, Saint Louis, Missouri in Google Cultural Institute

Chess museums
Chess organizations
Chess
Museums in St. Louis
Central West End, St. Louis
1984 establishments in Missouri
Buildings and structures in St. Louis
Tourist attractions in St. Louis